Moses Mzila Ndlovu is a Zimbabwean legislator, a veteran of the 1970s liberation war, and a retired teacher. He is a member of House of Assembly for Bulilima West (MDC-M).

Biography 
He was born 1956 or 1957 in Bulilima District near Zimbabwe's border with Botswana, and grew up in the Thekwane village. He graduated as a teacher at Gwelo (now Gweru) Teacher's College. While at teaching college, Mzila became active in the youth league of Zimbabwe African People's Union (ZAPU). After graduating, Mzila relocated to Bulawayo where he taught in several schools, including Sobukhazi High School. Among his students was Believe Gaule (now Senator for Tsholotsho).

While he was at Sobukhazi, Mzila made the decision to join the Zimbabwe War of Independence, fighting with ZIPRA, the armed wing of ZAPU.

He attended military training in the Soviet Union, Cuba and Angola before returning to the battle front as a ZIPRA platoon commander, operating along the Zambia-Zimbabwe boundaries.

Demobilisation and civilian life 
At the end of the war in 1980, disappointed that ZANU and not ZAPU had assumed control, Mzila returned to Zimbabwe, demobilised from the army and re-assumed civilian life. 

The years between 1982 and 1987 saw the Gukurahundi genocide, where ZANU cracked down on dissidence among ex-ZIPRA militants by massacring the Ndebele people in their homeland of Matebeleland, in what the International Association of Genocide Scholars have described as a genocide. During this time, Mzila was a teacher in rural Matebeleland, teaching at a few schools in Lupane District, including Fatima, Regina Mundi, and St Paul's. As a known ex-ZIPRA, Mzila's life was in constant danger, though his guerilla training helped him survive in these times. During the massacres, he developed a stronger bond with rural peasants, as he saw them being victimised on grounds of conscience and ethnicity. 

Later, Mzila furthered his education and became a college lecturer. He lectured at Hillside Teacher's College, Gwanda ZINTEC (now Joshua Mqabuko Nkomo Polytechnic) and United College of Education (UCE). At UCE, Mzila taught Sociology of Education, and was regarded well by his students for his charisma and style. It was during his time as a college lecturer that he helped reform and strengthen the College Lecturers Association of Zimbabwe (COLAZ). COLAZ became an affiliate of the Zimbabwe Congress of Trade Unions (ZCTU), the latter of which was very influential to the formation of the Movement for Democratic Change (MDC) in 1999.

The 2000 elections 
Mzila became part of a group of civil servants who braved the government and openly organised for the opposition. Mzila contested the then Bulilimamangwe South Parliamentary seat in the February 2000 elections on an MDC ticket and won. He has retained that seat up to this date.

Party leadership 
Mzila was to become an influential figure within the then united MDC. He was elected chairman for his home province of Matebeleland South, a position that made him a member of the party's National Executive Committee and National Council. 
His name soon became a brand of mass mobilisation to the extent that under his leadership, his party, both before and after the split, has always attained majority seats in his province. 
His trademark song 'Guerilla ilanga litshonile solalaphi' and Fidel Castro dress code soon became symbols of resistance and victory against state oppression in the Matebeleland South.
At National level Mzila was appointed Secretary for International Relations in the party. This position however set him in various occasional clashes with Presidential Advisor on International Relations the late Professor Eliphas Mukonoweshuro.
As early as 2004, intraparty violence showed up in the MDC. Legislators like Edwin Mushoriwa (now MDC Deputy President) and Priscilla Misihairabwi-Mushonga (now MDC Secretary General and Government Minister) and other national leaders like Frank Chamunorwa (now MDC vice-chairman) and Shupikai Mandaza were all attacked by armed party youths. 
A commission of inquiry composed of Advocate H. Zhou, the late Senator Enna Chitsa and Mzila among others was appointed to investigate the causes and extent of the conflict. Renowned party activists like the late George Kawuzani, Bertha Chokururama and Tonderai Ndira among others were hauled before the Zhou Commission. 
Written, video and audio recordings were made and submitted to the united MDC President Morgan Tsvangirai (now Prime Minister of Zimbabwe).
“After going through our findings Tsvangirai called and said "you deserve my respect. These kinds of confessions are what the CIO (Central Intelligence Organization) is looking for and had they put their hands on this you would have never been broke in your life", says Mzila explaining the integrity and secrecy with which they conducted the commission. "I however do not understand why he disregarded our recommendations", he adds. 
After the infamous 12 October 2005 MDC split Mzila went with the 'pro-Senate' group where he retained both positions of Matebeleland South Provincial chairman and National Secretary for International Relations. He held these two positions until January 2011 where Congress elected him to the powerful post of Deputy Secretary General.

Advocacy work 
In the whole of Zimbabwe, Mzila has become the natural face of the fight for truth, justice and reconciliation for the victims and perpetrators of Gukurahundi atrocities. This, he has achieved through coining consistent and persistent messages that have become a hallmark of his addresses be it in rallies, funerals, church functions, public meetings and even Parliament.
His consistency has won him invitations to speak in various platforms in and outside Zimbabwe on one hand, while on the other subjecting him to attacks by political opponents and series of traps by the state ultimately leading to his arrest on 16 April 2011 in Lupane. It is also, inarguably, his consistency that made him natural successor to the late Gibson Sibanda as Minister of State in the Organ for National, Healing, Reconciliation and Integration (ONHRI).

Government work 
On 25 February 2009, Mzila was sworn in as Deputy Minister of Foreign Affairs. He was to become Deputy to ZANU PF's Simbarashe Mumbengegwi, a man he would later describe as 'a terrible work mate'. By then Mzila still held the position of International Relations Secretary in his party and his appointment as Deputy Minister of Foreign Affairs would have been a great match had he not been with his 'terrible workmate'. 
He however tried his best to create socio-cultural ties between rural Zimbabwean artists and Africa leading to Mokis Connection's (a rural Bulilima musical group) visit to Algeria.

After the death of Gibson Sibanda in August 2010, Mzila succeeded him as Minister of State in the Organ for National, Healing, Reconciliation and Integration. 
In other quasi-government bodies, Mzila serves as one of the six negotiators to the Global Political Agreement and a member of the management committee of the Committee of Parliament of the new Constitution (COPAC).

Arrests, harassments and detentions 
On 16 April 2011, while driving to address a public meeting in Victoria Falls at the invitation of Uluntu Ciisi Trust, just after passing the grounds where Lupane Government complex is pegged he was stopped by a police road block. The junior officers advised him that their superiors at the camp had sent for him and he should pass by. 
 
The ex-combatant would then celebrate the country's 31st Independence and other weeks to follow behind bars and in a heavy search for justice.
He was summarily accused of contravening the notorious Criminal Law (Codification) and Reform Act by attending a church prayer meeting at Silwane Primary School in Lupane and encouraging attendants to speak openly about their grievances.
However the greatest and real crime is his leadership style. Soon after his appointment in October 2010, Mzila introduced a new people-centered approach to the task of ONHRI. 
He began to attend civic society meetings and church gatherings in rural areas encouraging victims of atrocities to speak openly about their problems and prescribe solutions thereof. This irked the state and a plethora of plots against him were made. These included denying him fuel to travel from Harare to Matebeleland, breaking into his office, his arrest on 16 April 2011, subsequent harassment and humiliation and draconian bail conditions which he later appealed against and won.

Mzila is no stranger to arrests and detentions. Prior to the 16 April arrest he had served a six-month sentence at the notorious Khami Maximum Prison. This sentence came in 2003 during the state's clamp down on MDC leaders accusing them of violence, treason, arson and other crimes.
“I found myself in a small prison cell full of young people in their twenties and they looked at me with faces that I read to be saying 'what is this grey haired man looking for here?'. Others were however quick to notice who I was and we spent several nights singing songs of freedom. Oppressive and unforgettable as it was, this is an experience that rejuvenated my fighting spirit", he explains.
While on bail following the 16 April arrest, Mzila was briefly detained together with Prof. Ncube, Misihairabwi-Mushonga, Paul Themba Nyathi, Youth Secretary General Discent Collins Bajila and sixteen other MDC leaders after attending a house meeting in Victoria Falls.

In 2018, Ndlovu was denied a visa to visit the United Kingdom to speak at a St Andrews University event to discuss the Gukurahundi massacres.

References

Members of the National Assembly of Zimbabwe
Living people
Year of birth missing (living people)